The PPG 375 is an NTT IndyCar Series event held at Texas Motor Speedway near Fort Worth, Texas since 1997. The races have had a variety of different entitlement sponsors and distances over the years and therefore has had many different names.

History
The first Championship/Indy car races in the Dallas/Fort Worth area took place at Arlington Downs Raceway in nearby Arlington, Texas. AAA sanctioned five races from 1947 to 1950. USAC sanctioned ten Championship car events at Texas World Speedway in College Station, Texas. The race was discontinued when the track closed in 1981.

In 1997, the IndyCar Series debuted at Texas Motor Speedway. The event was traditionally a single race held on a Saturday night in early June. Twice, in 2011 and 2021, the series has held twin races at the track. From 1997 until 2005, it served as the first race after the Indianapolis 500. It resumed this place in 2010 and in 2011. In 2020, it served as the first race of the season due to the COVID-19 pandemic. In 2021 the event moved to the first weekend in May, and in 2022 the event was moved to a March date.

Second race

From 1998 to 2004, a second 500 km IndyCar Series race was held at the track in the fall. It served as the IndyCar Series' season finale for each of its runnings.

In 2003, Gil de Ferran was leading on lap 187 when Kenny Bräck crashed on the backstretch. The massive accident seriously injured Bräck, and he raced only limitedly afterwards. With the race winding down under caution, and with cleanup still ongoing, officials stopped the race after 195 laps when it was clear they would not have time to go back to green. de Ferran was declared the winner in what was his final race in IndyCar (he had announced his retirement during the season).

Race length
IndyCar Series races were originally 208 laps (312 mi/500 km) long. In 2007, the race was lengthened to 228 laps in an effort to create a longer product for time value purposes. Using the traditional  measurement, the race became 342 miles (550.4 km). However, official IndyCar timing and scoring maintained the  measurement, and the race was officially 331.74 miles (533.88 km). In 2014, the race was extended to 600 kilometers. After revamping the oval track in 2016, the new one lap measurement is 1.44 miles for lap speed calculations.

In addition, the start time was moved to 9:00 p.m. CDT (10:00 p.m. EDT) so the event would take place almost entirely under the lights, rather than in the mid-summer twilight.

The race was slightly shortened to 300 miles and 200 laps in 2020, due to COVID-19 pandemic protocols that used same-day practice and qualifying for the event. The 2020 Genesys 300 was the first IndyCar event since a hiatus due to the pandemic. The 300-mile distance will also be used for 2021.

Twin races
For 2011, a special Twin race format was adopted, a throwback to the USAC-style twin races of the 1970s and early 1980s. The race would consist of two 275-km (114 laps) races, with each race declaring a separate winner, and each race awarding half points towards the season championship. The starting lineup for the first race was determined during standard time trials. After the completion of the first race, a "halftime" was observed, and the starting lineup for the second race was determined by a random draw.

A mild controversy resulted from the halftime draw for the second race's lineup. It differed from previous "twin" races where the finishing positions for the first race determined the lineup, or the finishing positions were inverted. It was considered unfair by some, and it was magnified when points contenders Will Power and Dario Franchitti drew 3rd and 28th starting positions, respectively. For 2012, the twin-race format was scrapped.

In 2021 Texas hosted a twin-race weekend with two separate points-paying events, named Genesys 300 and XPEL 375 and held on May 1 and 2 respectively. Qualifying for both rounds was canceled due to rain, with the starting grid decided by the championship standings entering each race. Álex Palou, competing for Chip Ganassi Racing, was awarded pole position for the Genesys 300 as he was the points leader following the previous round at St. Petersburg. Scott Dixon, who started ninth, won the first race and took his only victory of the season. Dixon advanced to take the lead in the points standings, and consequently started the XPEL 375 on pole the following day. The second race was won by Arrow McLaren SP's Pato O'Ward, who claimed his first IndyCar Series victory.

Planned CART race

CART scheduled a race at the track for April 29, 2001. Following practice and qualifying, however, the race was cancelled "due to irresolvable concerns over the physical demands placed on the drivers at race speeds."

The Dayton Indy Lights race was completed with two cautions.

PJ1 Usage
Starting in 2019 Texas Motor Speedway began to apply PJ1 TrackBite on the high portion of the banking on the track. This was done for NASCAR, who runs multiple events at the speedway and whose cars benefit from the addition of the substance on the track. For IndyCars however the application of PJ1 has created numerous problems. IndyCar's harder tire compounds struggle to grab onto to the PJ1, which combined with the lower downforce levels of IndyCar's current aerodynamic package has led many drivers to compare driving on the substance to driving on ice. Because the drivers avoid the PJ1 coated sections of the banking so called "marbles" from the worn tires are thrown by the cars onto the PJ1 coated surface, exacerbating the problem of low grip on those banks of the track. This in turn makes Texas Motor Speedway a one groove racetrack for the IndyCars and has resulted several accidents in the races run at the speedway since the PJ1 was first applied. IndyCar drivers have become very critical of the track at Texas in recent years and have complained that the PJ1 results in racing that is both uninteresting and unsafe at the same time.

For 2022 IndyCar and Dallara unveiled bargeboards for use at Texas in attempt to open up the portions of the track coated with PJ1 to the drivers. The bargeboards are expected to add an additional 200 pounds of downforce on top of the UAK18 superspeedway aero kit and will be optional for teams to use during both qualifying and the race.

Past winners

AAA Championship car history (Arlington)

USAC Championship car history (College Station)
See Texas World Speedway

IndyCar Series history (Fort Worth)

1997: Billy Boat took the checkered flag as the winner due to scoring error; Luyendyk declared official winner the following day.
2000: Postponed from Saturday night to Sunday afternoon due to rain.
2016: Postponed from Saturday to Sunday due to rain, then suspended until August 27 due to rain and logistical issues.

Indy Lights
2001: Damien Faulkner
2002: A. J. Foyt IV
2003: Thiago Medeiros
2004: Thiago Medeiros
2005: Travis Gregg

Notes

External links
IndyCar.com 
Champ Car Stats
IndyCar Results Page

Genesys 600
1947 establishments in Texas
Recurring sporting events established in 1947
Recurring sporting events disestablished in 1950
1973 establishments in Texas
Recurring sporting events established in 1973
Recurring sporting events disestablished in 1973
1976 establishments in Texas
Recurring sporting events established in 1976
Recurring sporting events disestablished in 1979
1997 establishments in Texas
Recurring sporting events established in 1997
IndyCar Series races